Severe Tropical Storm Talas was a tropical cyclone that impacted Vietnam during mid July 2017. Talas was first tracked as a tropical disturbance over in the South China Sea on July 13, and was upgraded to a tropical depression during the next day. The depression intensified into the fourth named storm of the 2017 Pacific typhoon season during July 15. Before making landfall in Vietnam, Talas reached its peak intensity as a severe tropical storm during July 16. Talas weakened to an area of low pressure on July 17 inland.

Throughout Vietnam, the storm killed 14 people and damaged around 2,700 houses. Rough seas sunk about 50 boats. Damage was estimated at 2.52 trillion₫ (US$109 million).

Meteorological history

By the next day, at around 06:00 UTC, the Japan Meteorological Agency (JMA) classified the system as a weak tropical depression, as it started to move slowly towards the northwest. Six hours later, the JMA began issuing advisories, noting that the system was producing 10-minute sustained winds of at least . The JTWC issued a Tropical Cyclone Formation Alert at 02:30 UTC on July 15 after satellite imagery depicted deep convection wrapping into its developing low-level circulation center. With the system continuing to develop, the JMA upgraded it to a tropical storm, assigning it the name Talas. As convective banding improved, the JTWC upgraded the disturbance to a tropical depression by midday on July 15.

On July 16, Talas gradually intensified as it became better organized in response to being located in a favorable environment, consisting of low to moderate northeasterly vertical wind shear as well as good outflow to the south. Shortly thereafter, Talas began to weaken due to land interaction and the JMA soon downgraded the system back to a tropical storm. Around 18:00 UTC, Talas made landfall in Central Vietnam, near the city of Vinh. Three hours later, the JTWC issued their final advisory on Talas as it continued to degrade while progressing inland. The JMA soon followed suit with their final advisory at 09:00 UTC on July 17 while the weakening Talas was located over the northern portion of Laos.

Preparations and impact

Vietnam
Talas made landfall near Vinh at around 18:00 UTC on July 16 as a moderate tropical storm. According to the Central Steering Committee for Natural Disaster Prevention and Rescue, more than 2,700 homes were damaged in Nghe An Province. Over  of rain fell in the central and northern parts of the country in the two days following up to landfall, while the capital, Hanoi, received . The storm sank a coal ship late on July 16; only three of the people on board were rescued while another ten remained missing. During July 17, flooded streets and disrupted train services stranded more than 4,000 passengers in the capital. Railway services from Hanoi to Vinh were canceled while trains from Hanoi to Saigon were delayed by five to seven hours.

Overall, in Vietnam, the storm left 14 people dead and damaged around 2,700 houses. About 50 boats sank. Damages in Nghe An were reported to reach up to 993 billion₫ (US$43.7 million). Total damage in Vietnam reached 1.6 trillion₫ (US$70.4 million).

Hainan
During July 22, China's National Observatory issued a "blue alert" to Hainan province and the Beibu Gulf. About 22,901 fishing boats were moved while 39,425 people working at sea farms evacuated to Guangdong province. About 49 tourists were stranded from an island off the coast of Guandong. Total economic losses in Hainan Province reached CNY 24 million (US$3.5 million). In total, damage by Talas in China reached CNY 60 million (US$8.8 million).

See also

Weather of 2017
Tropical cyclones in 2017
Other tropical cyclones named Talas
Typhoon Cary (1987)
Tropical Storm Mekkhala (2008)
Tropical Storm Nock-ten (2011)
Typhoon Wutip (2013)

References

External links

JMA General Information of Severe Tropical Storm Talas (1704) from Digital Typhoon
JMA Best Track Data of Severe Tropical Storm Talas (1704) 

06W.TALAS  from the U.S. Naval Research Laboratory

2017 disasters in Vietnam
2017 Pacific typhoon season
July 2017 events in Asia
Typhoons in Vietnam
Western Pacific severe tropical storms
Talas